Brenda Gilmore (born December 9, 1952) is a former Democratic member of the Tennessee Senate, representing the 19th District between 2019-2023.

Education and non-political career
Brenda Gilmore graduated with a Bachelor of Science in Business degree from Tennessee State University in 1984, and with a Master of Human Resource Development degree from Vanderbilt University in 1988. She is also a graduate of the Tennessee Government Executive Institute, the Vanderbilt Leadership Development Forum, and Leadership Nashville. From 1979 to 1987, she worked at the Tennessee Department of General Services. She is the Director of Mail Service at Vanderbilt University and has been director of State Postal Services. She has been a clerk and secretary of Fairfield Baptist Church and a Sunday School teacher.

She served on the Nashville Metro Council from the 1st District from 1993 to 2003. She was then elected to the Tennessee House. During the 2003-2007 session, she was the chairwoman of the Budget and Finance Committee.

Personal life
Her daughter, Erica Gilmore, is a member of the Nashville Metro Council from the 19th district.

References

African-American state legislators in Tennessee
African-American women in politics
Metropolitan Council members (Nashville, Tennessee)
Democratic Party Tennessee state senators
Tennessee State University alumni
Vanderbilt University alumni
Women state legislators in Tennessee
People from Sumner County, Tennessee
1952 births
Living people
Women city councillors in Tennessee
21st-century American politicians
21st-century American women politicians
African-American city council members